The 1948 Bowling Green Falcons football team, sometimes known as the Beegees, was an American football team that represented Bowling Green State College (later renamed Bowling Green State University) as an independent during the 1948 college football season. In their eighth season under head coach Robert Whittaker, the Falcons compiled an 8–0–1 record and outscored opponents by a total of 230 to 100. Vern Dunham was the team captain. The team compiled its home games at University Stadium in Bowling Green, Ohio.

The school registered a record-breaking enrollment of 4,525 students at the beginning of the 1948-49 school year.

Schedule

References

Bowling Green
Bowling Green Falcons football seasons
College football undefeated seasons
Bowling Green Falcons football